Since independence in 1844, the Dominican Republic has counted 54 people in the presidential office, whether constitutional, provisional, or interim, divided into 66 periods of government. Likewise, there are also periods in which the head of state role has been exercised by collegiate bodies (such as triumvirates, military juntas, or councils of state).

First Republic (1844–1861)

Central Government Junta 

The Central Government Junta was the first body of a collegiate and provisional nature to exercise the executive, legislative and judicial powers of the nascent Dominican state. It was provisionally constituted on 28 February 1844 and subsequently formalized on 1 March 1844; it went through two coups d'état, and finally dissolved with the proclamation of the first Constitution on 6 November 1844.

Presidents

Spanish annexation (1861–1865)

Dominican Restoration War (1863–1865)

Second Republic (1865–1916)

United States occupation (1916–1924)

Third Republic (1924–1965)

Dominican Civil War (1965)

Fourth Republic (1966–present)

Timeline from 1965

See also 
 History of the Dominican Republic
 Captaincy General of Santo Domingo
 List of colonial governors of Santo Domingo
 Politics of the Dominican Republic
 President of the Dominican Republic
 Vice President of the Dominican Republic

References 

Dominican Republic
Presidents
Presidents